Disharoon's plantation was located in  Tensas Parish, Louisiana and was used as a steamboat landing on the Mississippi River by Union Army General Ulysses S. Grant during the American Civil War.

Grant's Vicksburg operations
Union Maj. Gen. John A. McClernand's XII Corps of the Army of the Tennessee occupied the plantation on April 29, 1863, after marching across the base of Coffee Point from Hard Times Plantation. Grant decided to land in Mississippi at Bruinsburg.

Destruction
Disharoon's Plantation was destroyed by Mississippi River flood waters shortly after the Civil War.

References

External links

Plantations in Louisiana
Houses in Tensas Parish, Louisiana